Danes Moss Nature Reserve is a  nature reserve south of Macclesfield, Cheshire, England. A Site of Special Scientific Interest, it is managed by the Cheshire Wildlife Trust.

Danes Moss is a lowland raised bog, a rare and threatened habitat in the United Kingdom. Seven species of Sphagnum moss are found here. Locally uncommon plants include round-leaved sundew (Drosera rotundifolia), marsh cinquefoil (Potentilla palustris), bottle sedge (Carex rostrata), common lousewort (Pedicularis sylvatica) and fen bedstraw (Galium uliginosum) and the nationally rare Labrador-tea (Rhododendron tomentosum).

The reserve is also known for its insects. Eleven species of dragonflies and damselflies have been recorded, including the black darter (Sympetrum danae) (Britain's smallest dragonfly) and the four-spotted chaser (Libellula quadrimaculata). They are joined by 19 species of butterfly, including the green hairstreak (Callophrys rubi).

References 

Nature reserves in Cheshire
Sites of Special Scientific Interest in Cheshire
Cheshire Wildlife Trust reserves